Idrisov is a surname of Russian origin, used mainly by Muslim people in post-Soviet countries.

People 
 Abukhadzhi Idrisov (1918—1983), Chechen sniper of the Soviet Army in World War II
 Farid Idrisov (born 1954), Russian composer of Bashkir origin, known as one of authors of the National Anthem of the Republic of Bashkortostan
 Mikhail Idrisov (born 1988), Russian sprinter
 Erlan Idrissov (Idrisov) (born 1959), Kazakh politician, Foreign Minister of the Republic of Kazakhstan

Surnames of Russian origin